Kuroko are stagehands in traditional Japanese theatre, who dress all in black.
 Kuroko type deposit, a sub-type of the bimodal-felsic Volcanogenic massive sulfide ore deposit

Kuroko may also refer to several fictional characters:
 Tetsuya Kuroko, the main character of the manga Kuroko's Basketball
 Kuroko (Samurai Shodown), a character in the Samurai Shodown series
 Kuroko (Ninja-Boy), a character in the Power Instinct series
 Kuroko Shirai, a character in the manga/anime Toaru Majutsu no Index and its spinoff To Aru Kagaku no Railgun
 Kuroko Sato (née Sanada), a minor character in the manga/anime YuYu Hakusho
 Kuroko Smith, a character in Monster Musume